The videography of English singer Cliff Richard consists of 38 video albums, one video compilation album, three video box sets, and 62 music videos. A number of these albums have been reissued and subsequently recharted. Richard's first music video was for his 1976 single "Miss You Nights", which coincided with his resurgence in popularity.

Video albums

Video album reissues

Video compilation albums

Video box sets

Music videos

See also
 Cliff Richard singles discography
 Cliff Richard albums discography

References

External links

Discographies of British artists
Rock music discographies
Pop music discographies
Videography